Donald E. Booth (born 13 July 1952) is an American diplomat who is serving as the U.S. Special Envoy for Sudan. Between August 2013 and January 2017, he was the U.S. Special Envoy to Sudan and South Sudan.  Prior to his appointments as special envoy, Mr. Booth served as the Ambassador of the United States to Liberia, Zambia, and Ethiopia.

Early life
Booth attended Georgetown University, where he earned a bachelor's degree in foreign service; Boston University, where he earned an MBA; and the National War College, where he earned a master's degree in national security studies.

Diplomatic career
Booth initially served in a number of diplomatic posts, including Economic Counselor in Athens, Division Chief of Bilateral Trade Affairs at the State Department, International Relations Officer in the Office of Eastern European Affairs, desk officer for the Office of Egyptian Affairs and the Office of East African Affairs, and various positions at the U.S. embassies to Romania, Gabon, Liberia, and Belgium.

Immediately prior to his appointment as ambassador to Liberia in 2005, he had served as Deputy Director of the Office of Southern African Affairs, Director of the Office of West African Affairs, and Director of the Office of Technical and Specialized Agencies in the State Department's Bureau of International Organization Affairs.

Booth was appointed Ambassador to Liberia by George W. Bush in 2005; he was confirmed by the U.S. Senate on June 16, 2005, and arrived in Liberia on July 29. On June 4, 2008, he was confirmed as the new U.S. ambassador to Zambia. He left his post in Liberia on July 11, and took up the post in Zambia on September 19.

He was nominated to become Ambassador to Ethiopia by President Barack Obama on December 9, 2009, and was confirmed by the U.S. Senate. He was nominated to become the U.S. Special Envoy to Sudan and South Sudan by President Obama on Wednesday, August 28, 2013. Booth served as the US Envoy to Sudan and South Sudan until 2017. He led the U.S. government's effort to "normalize relations" with the genocidal regime in Sudan and repeatedly worked to make it easier for Sudan to comply with the U.S. requirements to lift sanctions on Sudan. In South Sudan, Booth oversaw U.S. policy that sidelined Vice President Riek Machar and solidified U.S. support for President Salva Kiir despite Kiir's continued efforts to thwart peace efforts and sponsorship of mass atrocities. Sidelining Machar and saying that he should not return to Juba exacerbated the conflict, solidified Kiir's ruling authority, and was a tacit endorsement of Kiir's military's continued human rights abuses and atrocities committed against the South Sudanese people.

The Trump administration re-appointed Donald Booth to be the Special Envoy for Sudan on June 10, 2019 and announced his appointment two days later.

References

External links

U.S. Department of State's Brussels Regional Media Hub , July 23, 2019

|-

|-

|-

|-

1952 births
Ambassadors of the United States to Liberia
Ambassadors of the United States to Zambia
Ambassadors of the United States to Ethiopia
Boston University School of Management alumni
Walsh School of Foreign Service alumni
Living people
National War College alumni
United States Special Envoys
United States Foreign Service personnel
21st-century American diplomats